The 52nd International 500 Mile Sweepstakes was held at the Indianapolis Motor Speedway in Speedway, Indiana on Thursday May 30, 1968. For the second year in a row, one of Andy Granatelli's STP Turbine-powered machines was leading late in the race, but once again, it failed within sight of victory.

On lap 174, Lloyd Ruby's engine misfired allowing Joe Leonard to take the lead in the Lotus 56 Turbine. Leonard, however, suffered a flameout on the lap 191 restart, and rolled to a silent and shocking halt. Bobby Unser in the venerable piston-powered Offenhauser, inherited the lead, and despite gear linkage trouble, won the first of his three Indy 500 victories (1968, 1975, 1981).

This was the final Indianapolis 500 to feature a front-engined car in the starting field. Of the 33 cars, 32 were rear-engined machines (including three turbines). Jim Hurtubise's entry, which dropped out after only nine laps, was the last front-engine car to race in the 500. This was also the first 500 won by a turbocharged engine.

During the month, film crews were on hand to film various action shots and stock footage of the race proceedings to be used in the 1969 film Winning, starring Paul Newman.

With  of precipitation in the Indianapolis area in May, the 1968 race featured the wettest month on record for the Indy 500. Rain hampered practice and qualifying, but did not affect race day.

This was the most recent Indy 500 scheduled for Thursday; the Uniform Monday Holiday Act was implemented in 1971 and Memorial Day became a three-day weekend (Saturday–Monday) every year. A day previously avoided, Sunday became the scheduled race day beginning in 1974.

Race schedule
Time trials was scheduled for four days, but for the first time under the current schedule format, qualifying was carried over into a fifth day. Most of Bump Day (May 26) was rained out, and the track closed due to darkness with the field not yet filled to 33 cars. A special session was held Monday in order to complete the field.

The 500 Festival Parade was held Tuesday night, May 28.

Practice and time trials

The 1968 Indianapolis 500 was the second and ultimately the final year of participation by the controversial STP Granatelli Turbine machines. For 1968, the Pratt & Whitney turbine engine was installed in the Lotus 56 chassis, often known colloquially as the "Wedge Turbine," and sometimes affectionately as the "Doorstop." In a veiled effort to curtail the turbine's power output, USAC had imposed revised regulations regarding the maximum annulus inlet (reduced from 23.999 in² to 15.999 in²).

Another rule change dictated that cars were required to conduct three mandatory pit stops, up from two that were required from 1965 to 1967.

Mike Spence was fatally injured after a crash in turn one on May 7. A tire broke off his Lotus "Wedge" Turbine and struck him in the head. He died of his injuries a few hours after the accident after being taken to the hospital. Spence's death came one month after Jim Clark's at Hockenheim; Clark was scheduled to drive one of the Lotus Wedge Turbines at Indy.

Pole Day Time trials – Saturday May 18
Graham Hill, the 1966 winner in the #70 STP Turbine, was first to qualify and set a new qualifying record.

Second Day time trials – Sunday May 19
Rain kept cars off the track most of the day. Only two cars were able to make an attempt, and only one was run to completion.

At the conclusion of the first weekend of time trials, the field was filled to 16 cars.

Third Day time trials – Saturday May 25
Sixteen cars made a total of 24 attempts, and filled the field to 26 cars. High winds kept some cars off the track, and speeds were down from the previous weekend.

After qualifying, Ronnie Bucknum's car was disqualified for being  underweight.

Fourth day time trials – Sunday May 26
With the field filled to 25 cars (eight spots open), rain kept the cars off the track until late in the day. The final scheduled day of time trials ("Bump Day") was almost a complete wash out. The traditional 6 o'clock closing time came and went, and the track was still wet. Track crews continued to work, and the track opened for practice at 6:55 p.m. After the mandatory 30-minute practice session, the track opened for time trials at 7:31 p.m.

With overcast skies and darkness looming, three cars made attempts. Bill Puterbaugh and Bill Cheesbourg completed runs, while Bobby Johns spun on his second warm up lap. At that time, officials deemed the conditions unsafe due to darkness, and postponed the remainder of qualifying until Monday morning.

Time trials – Monday May 27
For the first time since 1952, time trials were pushed into a fifth day. Officials ruled that all 25 cars that were in the starting field at 6 p.m. Sunday (May 26) were "locked in" and could not be bumped. In addition, all cars that were in line to qualify Sunday evening at 7:54 p.m. were eligible to make one qualifying attempt on Monday. Only cars that qualified after 6 p.m. on Sunday evening were subject to bumping (including Puterbaugh and Cheesbourg).

Ronnie Bucknum was reinstated to the field when it was determined that during his inspection, the scale used to weight the car was defective. With Bucknum's car back in the field, only seven spots were now available.

Though rain hampered the day, the qualifying was successfully completed on Monday. A frantic session saw two crashes (Bob Hurt and Rick Muther). Eighteen cars took to the track to fill the seven open spots. Both Puterbaugh and Cheesebourg were bumped, and Mike Mosley was the fastest of the day. Jim Hurtubise qualified his front-engined Mallard for 30th starting position. It would be the final front-engined car to qualify for the Indy 500.

Race Day

First half
At the drop of the green flag, Joe Leonard in the #60 STP Turbine took the lead, with Bobby Unser in second and Roger McCluskey up to third at the end of lap one. A fast pace was set over the first 100 miles, with no yellow caution lights. Bobby Unser took the lead for the first time on lap 8, and led most of the first half.

After only nine laps, Jim Hurtubise in the front-engined PepsiCo Frito-lay special had burned a piston, and was out, finishing 30th, the final front-engined "roadster" to race at lap at the 500. Also in the pits was Mario Andretti, who dropped out with a bad piston. Moments later, he hopped into the car of his teammate Larry Dickson, but that was also short-lived. That car also suffered a broken piston after 24 laps.

On lap 41, the caution flag flew for the first time. Al Unser, Sr. made a routine pit stop, but a fire broke out in the turbocharger. He was able to return to the race, but after only one lap, he lost a wheel and hit the wall in turn one. Arnie Knepper and Gary Bettenhausen were also involved. After , defending champion A. J. Foyt was out with a blown engine.

Second half
On lap 110, Graham Hill lost a wheel and smashed into the turn two wall, which brought out the second caution. It was the first of the three Granatelli Turbines to drop out of the race. On the restart, Bobby Unser took the lead, blowing by Joe Leonard, showing the traditional piston-powered engines were still a match for the powerful turbines.

On lap 127, Mel Kenyon and rookie Billy Vukovich II tangled in turn four. Both were able to re-enter the race, but Johnny Rutherford, while trying to slow down, was rear-ended by Jim McElreath. Mike Mosley also spun into the turn four grass trying to avoid the accident. Rutherford was out, but McElreath limped back to the pits where his crew repair the nosecone.

When Bobby Unser made his last pit stop on lap 166, his gearshift linkage was broken, and the car was stuck in high gear. As he slowly left his pit, struggling to accelerate back to racing speed, both Leonard and Ruby passed him. Leonard now led in the Turbine. Ruby was up to second, but moments later on lap 178, Ruby was back in the pits with a faulty ignition coil. His crew was able to replace the coil, but the six-minute pit stop dropped him out of contention for the win.

With 19 laps to go, Joe Leonard led, with Bobby Unser back up to second. Carl Williams crashed on the backstretch, triggering a fire which brought out the yellow light. Under the caution, Leonard led, with Bobby Unser second, and Dan Gurney in third. For a brief moment, a controversy started brewing as Art Pollard (teammate to Joe Leonard), who was a couple laps down, was not keeping up with the caution pace. As a result, Bobby Unser was stuck behind him, and losing track position to Leonard.

Finish
After the cleanup, the green flag was given to the field at the start of lap 192. At that instant, both leader Joe Leonard and his teammate Art Pollard hesitated and instantly slowed with identical snapped fuel pump drive shafts. The turbine engines again failed in sight of the finish, stunning the racing fraternity. Bobby Unser swept by into the lead with Dan Gurney inheriting second place. With a nearly full-lap lead, Unser cruised over the final nine laps to win his first Indianapolis 500.

Cars using Goodyear tires swept the top four positions, and Goodyear won their second 500 in row. Officials allowed the top five cars to finish the full 500 miles, then flagged the rest of the field off the track. This would be the final 500 in which finishers were named to the prestigious Champion Spark Plug 100 mph Club. Unlike the 1967 race, the Turbine did not run away from the field in 1968. Bobby Unser led the most laps in the Offenhauser, but Joe Leonard spent most of the day on Unser's tail, in the top three. Graham Hill ran in the top five, but complained that he lacked speed down the long straights, and was running 4th when he wrecked. Art Pollard, in the third Turbine, spent most of the day in the top ten before the car quit, but was never really a factor for the win.

Box score

Alternates
First alternate: Bruce Walkup  (#59, #62)

Failed to qualify

Sonny Ates  (#19, #31)
Rollie Beale  (#32, #88)
Chuck Booth (#34) – Entered, did not drive
Bill Cheesbourg (#22, #75, #81)
Jim Clark – Withdrawn
George Follmer  (#28, #41, #42)
Masten Gregory (#28, #95)
Bob Harkey (#71, #77, #88)
Chuck Hulse (#90) – Wrecked practice, retired
Bob Hurt  (#11, #14, #36, #72, #81, #90)
Bobby Johns (#17, #25)
Dee Jones  (#34, #46)
Ralph Ligouri  (#71, #77, #88)
Bruce McLaren  (#66, #69)
Al Miller (#9, #32)
Rick Muther  (#22, #28)
Danny Ongais  (#63) – Entry declined, lack of experience
Henry Pens  (#17) – Entry declined, lack of experience
Bill Puterbaugh  (#63, #71, #77)
Les Scott  (#50) – Failed refresher test
Mike Spence  (#30, #60) – Fatal accident
Chuck Stevenson (#90) – Wrecked, retired
Jackie Stewart (#20)
Jerry Titus  (#50, #71, #75, #76)
Greg Weld  (#17, #19, #30)
Dempsey Wilson (#51, #63, #81)
LeeRoy Yarbrough (#59, #62)

Race statistics

Qualification Chronology

Race notes
This was the fourth consecutive race victory for Bobby Unser in the 1968 season, he would go on the claim the National Championship.
This would be the final Indy 500 documented by the popular Floyd Clymer 500 Mile Race yearbooks.
6th-place finisher Ronnie Duman would be killed ten days later at Milwaukee.
Mike Spence was the third person with the surname of Spence (none of whom were related) to lose his life at the Speedway.

Broadcasting

Radio
The race was carried live on the IMS Radio Network. Sid Collins served as chief announcer. Len Sutton served as "driver expert" for the third year. At the conclusion of the race, Lou Palmer reported from victory lane.

Pre-race coverage was 30 minutes. The entire on-air crew remained consistent from 1966 & 1967. The broadcast was carried by over 900 affiliates including 761 in the United States, Armed Forces Network, the CBC, and reached New Zealand and Australia for the first time. The broadcast had an estimated 100 million listeners worldwide.

Collins greeted numerous guests in the booth during the race. Among those who stopped by were Chuck Stevenson, Sam Hanks, J. C. Agajanian, former (and future) radio analyst Fred Agabashian, Duke Nalon, Pete DePaolo, Henry Banks, Tom Binford, Johnnie Parsons, and Johnny Boyd. Indiana Senator Vance Hartke visited the booth, escorting a delegation that included Secretary of Transportation Alan Boyd. FCC chairman Rosel H. Hyde, Utah Senator Frank Moss, and Jack Kauffmann (The Washington Star). Senator Birch Bayh also visited the booth, accompanied by his teenage son, future senator Evan Bayh, who was attending his first race.  On the air, Evan correctly predicted Bobby Unser would win.

Television
The race was carried in the United States on ABC's Wide World of Sports. The broadcast was supposed to air on Saturday, June 8 but was postponed a week to Saturday June 15 due to the funeral that day of Senator Robert F. Kennedy. Jim McKay anchored the broadcast with Rodger Ward as analyst, and Chris Economaki as a pit reporter..

The race was shown live on MCA closed-circuit television in approximately 175 theaters across the United States. Charlie Brockman served as anchor.

Gallery

Notes

References

Works cited
Indianapolis 500 History: Race & All-Time Stats - Official Site
1968 Indianapolis 500 at RacingReference.info
1968 Indianapolis 500 Radio Broadcast, Indianapolis Motor Speedway Radio Network

Indianapolis 500 races
Indianapolis 500
Indianapolis 500
Indianapolis 500
Indianapolis 500